Pieter Vanden Bos (born November 5, 1961) is a former Canadian football offensive lineman who played seven seasons in the Canadian Football League with the Winnipeg Blue Bombers, Ottawa Rough Riders and BC Lions. He was drafted by the Edmonton Eskimos with he fourth overall pick of the 1983 CFL Draft. He played CIS football at the University of British Columbia.

References

External links
Just Sports Stats

Living people
1961 births
Players of Canadian football from Ontario
Canadian football offensive linemen
UBC Thunderbirds football players
Winnipeg Blue Bombers players
Ottawa Rough Riders players
BC Lions players
Canadian football people from Toronto